Juan Zariñena (1545–1634) was a Spanish painter.

Zariñena was born in Valencia. He studied under his father Francis and alongside his brother Christopher, both of whom were also painters. He primarily painted religious themed works and frescoes. One of Zariñena's frescoes can be seen at the Hall of Parliament in Valencia. He died in Valencia in 1634.

Gallery

References

16th-century Spanish painters
Spanish male painters
17th-century Spanish painters
People from Valencia
1545 births
1634 deaths
Fresco painters

Catholic painters